The George Raft Story is a 1961 American biographical film of Hollywood film star George Raft.  Ray Danton portrays Raft and the film was directed by Joseph M. Newman. The picture was retitled Spin of a Coin for release in the United Kingdom, a reference to Raft's character's nickel-flipping trick in Scarface (1932), the film that launched Raft's career as an actor known for portraying gangsters.

The film is a largely fictionalized version of Raft's turbulent life and career. Neville Brand appears briefly as Al Capone, recreating his role from the 1959 television series The Untouchables. Although other characters were fictional, Moxie was based on Raft's long-time friend and associate Mack Gray. Benjamin 'Bugsy' Siegel is a major character. No mention is made in the film of Raft's long-estranged wife Grayce (Mulrooney) or early mob benefactor Owney Madden.

George Raft and Mack Gray had played themselves almost two decades earlier in a markedly different but equally fictionalized biographical movie about Raft's early days as a dancer reluctantly involved with gangsters entitled Broadway (1942).

Plot
George Raft works in New York as a dancer at the Dreamland Casino. He associates with gangsters and goes into working at mob-controlled night clubs. One night he protects a cigarette girl, Ruth Harris, from being sexually harassed by a gangster. This causes his life to be in danger so he moves to Hollywood.

He breaks into filmmaking as an extra, then is cast as a gangster in Scarface. Al Capone asks to meet Raft and the actor fears for his life, but Capone reveals he likes the movie. At a party, Raft punches out a manager and they become friends.

Raft becomes a big star. He broadens his image making a dancing movie, Bolero. That is a hit but then Raft starts demanding rewrites and turning down gangster roles. He leaves his girlfriend for a Hollywood star he has an affair with.

Raft has financial trouble with the IRS and his friend Benny "Bugsy" Siegel is killed. He has to sell his Hollywood mansion and move into a small apartment. He gets a job working at a casino in Havana, but this ends when Castro comes to power.

Back in Hollywood he is offered to fix a fight by promoter Johnny Fuller but refuses. He gets a job in a Billy Wilder film Some Like It Hot.

Cast
 Ray Danton as George Raft
 Jayne Mansfield as Lisa Lang
 Julie London as Sheila Patton
 Barrie Chase as June Tyler
 Frank Gorshin as Moxie Cusack
 Barbara Nichols as Texas Guinan
 Brad Dexter as Benny 'Bugsy' Siegel
 Robert Strauss as Frenchie
 Herschel Bernardi as Sam
 Margo Moore as Ruth
 Neville Brand as Al Capone
 Joe De Santis as Frankie Donatella 
 Jack Lambert as Jerry Fitzpatrick
 Jack Albertson as Milton
 John Bleifer as Mr. Raft

Production
Allied Artists announced the film in 1959 as part of a slate of projects including Streets of Montamarte with Lana Turner as Suzanne Valadon, The Purple Gang with Barry Sullivan, Teacher was a Sexpot with Mamie Van Doren, Confessions of an English Opium Eater, Pay or Die with Ernest Borgnine as Joseph Petrosino and The Big Bankroll about Arnold Rothstein. It was announced again in 1960 with Ben Schwalb to be producer.

Schwalb said that filming would start October 7, 1960. Filming wounded up being delayed several more months. Ray Danton signed to play Raft, Brad Dexter was Bugsy Siegel and Jayne Mansfield played an unnamed star. Joseph Newman agreed to direct.

The Las Vegas comedy team Pepper Davis and Tony Reece was signed to play a support role. Frank Gorshin was also cast.

Danton, borrowed from Warner Bros, was cast on the strength of his performance in The Rise and Fall of Legs Diamond. Danton said he decided not to "do an impersonation of Raft... That solved most of my problems right there. I watched a lot of his old films and noticed a sort of strong suppressed hostility."

Danton says he only met Raft once and the actor told him ""We have to make careful they [the filmmakers] don't make this guy [Raft] into a heavy." Danton later said "I thought it was a strange, obtuse thing to say."

Dean Jennings wrote The George Raft Story in five instalments for the Saturday Evening Post. He was entitled to 20% of what Raft made from a picture based on his story. In June 1961 Jennings said he had no received anything and was suing.

Jayne Mansfield's character is based on Betty Grable.

Director Joseph Newman had directed Raft in I'll Get You for This (1951).

Filming started in July 1961.

Release
The film was known in the UK as Spin of a Coin.

Reception
According to Filmink the movie was "much mocked for its many fictitious aspects but a bit of truth sneaks in (such as Raft's difficulty to separate the roles he played from himself)."

References

External links
 
 
 
The George Raft Story at BFI
The George Raft Story at Letterbox DVD

1961 films
1960s biographical drama films
Allied Artists films
American biographical drama films
Biographical films about actors
American black-and-white films
Cultural depictions of actors
Cultural depictions of Al Capone
Films directed by Joseph M. Newman
1961 drama films
1960s English-language films
1960s American films